The 2015–16 European Rugby Champions Cup pool stage was the first stage of the 21st season of European club rugby union, and the second under the European Rugby Champions Cup format.

It involved 20 teams competing, across 5 pools of 4 teams, for 8 quarter-final places – awarded to the 5 pool winners and the 3 top-ranked pool runners-up.

The pool stage began on the weekend of 13 November 2015 but several games were postponed following the November 2015 Paris attacks. It was completed on the weekend of 23–25 January 2016.

Seeding
Twenty teams were seeded based on their performance in the three major European domestic leagues - the Premiership, the Pro12 and the Top 14. Teams were seeded based on their performance in the regular season, and, where applicable, subsequent play-off to determine a league champion. Where teams were eliminated in the same round of a knock-out tournament, their league position at the end of the regular season determined which team received a higher seed.

Teams were then placed into 4 Tiers, each containing 5 teams, based on their seeding. A draw determined which two second seeded teams completed Tier 1, and based on this, the fourth seeded teams were allocated to either Tier 2 and Tier 3.

The brackets show each team's seeding and their league (for example, 1 Top 14 indicates the team was seeded 1st from the Top 14).

Pool stage
The draw took place on 17 June 2015, at the Château de Neuchâtel, in Neuchâtel, Switzerland.

During the pool stage, the teams will play the 3 other teams in their pool twice, both at home and away, Based on the result of the match, teams receive competition points as follows:
 4 points for a win,
 2 points for a draw,
 1 attacking bonus point for scoring four or more tries in a match,
 1 defensive bonus point for losing a match by seven points or less.

Following the pool stage, the five winners from each group progress to the quarter-finals, along with the three best pool runners-up from the competition (the three of the five runners-up with the highest number of competition points). To seed the quarter-finals, the five pool winners will be ranked 1st to 5th and the three best-placed runners-up ranked 6th to 8th, based on who got the most competition points. In the event of a tie between two or more teams from the same pool, the following criteria would be used as tie-breakers:
 The club with the greater number of competition points from only matches involving tied teams.
 If equal, the club with the best aggregate points difference from those matches.
 If equal, the club that scored the most tries in those matches.

If this did not separate teams, and/or the tie related to teams that did not play each other (i.e., in different pools), the following tie breakers would be used:
 If equal, the club with the best aggregate points difference from the pool stage.
 The club that scored the most tries in the pool stage.
 If equal, the club with the fewest players suspended in the pool stage.
 If equal, the drawing of lots will determine a club's ranking.

Pool 1

Pool 2

Pool 3

Pool 4

Pool 5

Notes

References

2015–16 European Rugby Champions Cup
2015-16